The Harris House is located in Barneveld, Wisconsin.

History
The house, featuring unique lintels, was built by a local lumberman. Its purpose was to house visitors interested in a nearby mineral spring.

It was listed on the National Register of Historic Places in 1986 and on the State Register of Historic Places in 1989.

References

Houses on the National Register of Historic Places in Wisconsin
National Register of Historic Places in Iowa County, Wisconsin
Houses in Iowa County, Wisconsin
Queen Anne architecture in Wisconsin